Osama Al-Kharafi (born 24 April 1963) is a Kuwaiti fencer. He competed in the individual and team épée events at the 1980 and 1984 Summer Olympics.

References

External links
 

1963 births
Living people
Kuwaiti male épée fencers
Olympic fencers of Kuwait
Fencers at the 1980 Summer Olympics
Fencers at the 1984 Summer Olympics